A cardinal-nephew is a cardinal elevated by a pope who was his uncle, or more generally, his relative.   The practice of creating cardinal-nephews originated in the Middle Ages, and reached its apex during the 16th and 17th centuries. From the Avignon Papacy (1309–1377) until Pope Innocent XII's anti-nepotism bull, Romanum decet pontificem (1692), nearly every pope who appointed cardinals appointed at least one relative to the College of Cardinals, including every Renaissance-era pope.

Although nephews were the most common relation to be elevated to the College, other family members include (legitimate, illegitimate, or adopted) sons and grandsons, brothers, grandnephews, cousins and even uncles. At least 15, and possibly as many as 19 cardinal-nephews were later elected pope (Gregory IX, Alexander IV, Adrian V, Gregory XI, Boniface IX, Innocent VII, Eugene IV, Paul II, Alexander VI, Pius III, Julius II, Leo X, Clement VII, Benedict XIII, and Pius VII, perhaps also John XIX, Benedict IX, if they were really promoted cardinals, as well as Innocent III and Benedict XII, if in fact they were related to their elevators).  One became antipope (John XXIII), and two or three were canonized (Charles Borromeo, Guarinus of Palestrina, and perhaps Anselm of Lucca, if in fact he was really elected cardinal).

Similarly created cardinals include cardinal-nephews of antipopes and papal relatives made cardinals by other popes.

Notes on symbols
Because statements concerning the familial ties of popes and cardinals prior to 14th century are often of much later origin, some sources regard their factual accuracy as dubious. Thus, individuals are marked with:
, when the existence of the familial relationship is disputed, or
, when their promotion to the cardinalate is disputed.
Occupants of the curial office of the Cardinal Nephew are denoted with †.

11th century

12th century

13th century

14th century

15th century

16th century

17th century

18th century

19th century

Footnotes

Notes

References
 Brixius, Johannes M. 1912. Die Mitglieder des Kardinalkollegiums von 1130–1181. Berlin.
 Eubel, Konrad 1913. Hierarchia Catholica, vol. I-IX. Münster.
 Ganzer, Klaus 1963. Die Entwicklung des auswärtigen Kardinalats im hohen Mittelater. Tübingen. 
 Hüls, Rudolf 1977. Kardinäle, Klerus und Kirchen Roms: 1049–1130. Tübingen. 
 Kartusch, Elfriede 1984. Das Kardinalskollegium in der Zeit von 1181–1227. Vienna.
 Klewitz, Hans-Walter. 1957. Reformpapsttum und Kardinalkolleg. Darmstadt. 
 Maleczek, Werner 1984. Papst und Kardinalskolleg von 1191 bis 1216. Vienna.
 Paravicini Bagliani, Agostino. 1972. Cardinali di curia e "familiae" cardinalizie dal 1227 al 1254, 2 vols. Padova.
Robinson, I.S. 1990. The Papacy 1073–1198. Continuity and Innovation. Cambridge University Press. 
Thomson, John A. F. 1980. Popes and Princes, 1417–1517: Politics and Polity in the Late Medieval Church. Boston: George Allen & Unwin. .
Trollope, Thomas Adolphus. 1876. The papal conclaves, as they were and as they are. Chapman and Hall. 
Williams, George L. 2004. Papal Genealogy: The Families and Descendants of the Popes. McFarland. .
 Zenker, Barbara. 1964. Die Mitglieder des Kardinalkollegiums von 1130 bis 1159. Würzburg.

Nephews
Cardinal
cardinal